Lava is a district of the City Municipality of Celje and a locality in the northwestern part of the city of Celje. Until 1982, Lava was an independent settlement.

References

Geography of Celje
Districts of the City Municipality of Celje